Annia Aurelia Fadilla, most commonly known as Fadilla (159 – after 211) was one of the daughters born to Marcus Aurelius and his wife Faustina the Younger. She was a sister to Lucilla and Commodus. Fadilla was named in honor of her late maternal aunt Aurelia Fadilla. The cognomen Fadilla, was the cognomen of the mother and a half-sister of Antoninus Pius. Her maternal grandparents were Antoninus Pius and Faustina the Elder and her paternal grandparents were Domitia Lucilla and praetor Marcus Annius Verus.

Life 
Fadilla was born and raised in Rome. During the reign of her father, she married Marcus Peducaeus Plautius Quintillus, a Roman senator who later served twice as consul and as Augur, and a nephew of Roman emperor Lucius Verus who had co-ruled with her father from 161–169 and through adoption was her uncle. The mother Plautius Quintillus was Ceionia Fabia, sister of Lucius Verus. Fadilla bore Marcus Peducaeus Plautius Quintillus two children: a son, (Plautius) Quintillus, and a daughter, Plautia Servilla.

When her father died in 180, her remaining brother Commodus succeeded him as Roman emperor. During Commodus' reign, Fadilla and her family lived in a private palace on Capitoline Hill in Rome which was later bestowed by the later Roman emperor Elagabalus (218–222) as one of his mother's favorite residences. Her husband became one of Commodus' main advisers.

According to Herodian (History of the Roman Empire 1.13.1), Fadilla warned Commodus about Marcus Aurelius Cleander, a Praetorian prefect, who was becoming too powerful. With the help from one of her sisters, she uncovered and revealed a palace conspiracy aimed at the removal of Commodus in 189.

References

Sources 

159 births
3rd-century deaths
2nd-century Roman women
3rd-century Roman women
Nerva–Antonine dynasty
Annii
Aurelii Fulvi
Daughters of Roman emperors